In the Flesh – Live is a two-disc live album that captures performances from Roger Waters' three-year In the Flesh tour.

Overview
"My view is that I've been involved in two absolutely classic albums – The Dark Side of the Moon and The Wall," Waters told Classic Rock. "And if you haven't got Amused to Death, you haven't got the full set. So this album – the live one, which pulls together songs from all three albums – hopefully redresses the balance." The album features selected songs from a number of Pink Floyd albums, Waters' solo efforts and a new song "Each Small Candle".

DVD
A DVD of the same title was also produced, and the two were released in a new package in 2006. A SACD featuring both stereo and 5.1 mixes was also released.

The material for the DVD was taken from a 27 June 2000 performance at the Rose Garden Arena in Portland, Oregon, while the double CD contains various recordings drawn from four performances in Phoenix, AZ; Las Vegas, NV; Irvine, CA and Portland, OR.

Track listing
All songs written, composed and with lead vocals by Roger Waters, except where noted.

Disc one

Disc two

Notes
A. "Speak to Me" is not listed in the album sleeve, but is played before "Breathe (In the Air)".
B. The album sleeve listed the song as "The Pros and Cons of Hitch Hiking, Part 11 (AKA "5:06 AM (Every Stranger's Eyes)")".
C. "Each Small Candle" is previously unreleased.

Personnel
Roger Waters – bass guitar, acoustic & electric guitars, lead & backing vocals
Doyle Bramhall II – guitars, lead & backing vocals
Andy Fairweather Low – acoustic & electric guitars, bass guitar, backing vocals
Snowy White – electric & acoustic guitars
Andy Wallace – keyboards, Hammond organ, backing vocals
Jon Carin – keyboards, programming, lap steel guitar, acoustic guitar on "Dogs" and "Comfortably Numb", lead & backing vocals
Katie Kissoon – backing vocals, percussion, co-lead vocals on "Amused to Death"
Susannah Melvoin – backing vocals, percussion
P. P. Arnold – backing vocals, percussion, co-lead vocals on "Perfect Sense, Pt. 1 & 2"
Graham Broad – drums, percussion
Norbert Stachel – saxophones

Charts

Video Certifications

References

External links
 

Roger Waters video albums
Albums produced by James Guthrie (record producer)
2000 live albums